Canada–Lithuania relations are foreign relations between Canada and Lithuania. Both countries are full members of NATO and the Organization for Security and Co-operation in Europe.

History 
Diplomatic relations between Canada and Lithuania were established in 1937. In 1944, Lithuania was forcibly annexed by the Soviet Union and Canada never recognized the annexation of Lithuania into the Soviet Union. In 1990, Lithuania obtained its independence after the Dissolution of the Soviet Union and Canada and Lithuania re-established diplomatic relations on 2 September 1991. In 2016, both nations marked the 25th anniversary of the re-establishment of diplomatic relations.

Bilateral agreements
Both nations have signed bilateral agreements such as an Agreement on the Avoidance of Double Taxation (1997); Agreement of Social Security Cooperation (2006) and an Agreement for Youth Mobility (2010).

Trade 
In 2016, trade between Canada and Lithuania totaled US$422.8 million. Canadian exports to Lithuania reached US$51.1 million, and included machinery, motor vehicles and parts, fish and seafood, and electrical machinery and equipment. Lithuanian exports to Canada reached US$371.7 million, and included mineral fuels and oils, furniture and bedding, scientific and technical instruments, and fertilizers.

Resident diplomatic missions
 Canada has an embassy office in Vilnius.
 Lithuania has an embassy in Ottawa.

See also 
 Lithuanian Canadians

References

 
Lithuania 
Bilateral relations of Lithuania